Citrobacter koseri is a Gram-negative, non-spore-forming bacillus.  It is a facultative anaerobe capable of aerobic respiration. It is motile via peritrichous flagella.  It is a member of the family of Enterobacteriaceae. The members of this family are the part of the normal flora of human and animal digestive tracts.  C. koseri may act as an opportunistic pathogen in a variety of human infections.

Brain abscesses have a high rate of mortality and complications, therefore, neonates usually left with severe residual permanent damage. The transmission of C. koseri could be vertical from mother to fetus (local vaginal infection, rupture of the membranes, chorioamniotis may occur between the seventh and 11th day prior to delivery) and other sources can be horizontal nosocomial transmission by asymptomatic nursery staff.

Signs and symptoms
The neonates become very sick and present sepsis, meningitis, and cerebritis, seizures, apnea, and a bulging fontanelle. No evidence of stiff neck or high-grade fever is present.

Complications
Occasionally, it causes meningitis, but it can cause sepsis, ventriculitis, and cerebritis with 80% frequent multiple brain abscesses in low-birth-weight, immunocompromised neonates; rare cases have been reported in older children and adults, most of whom have underlying diseases.

Arterial and venous infarctions are possible because of the bacterial infiltration along the main vessel; exudates within the ventricles and ventriculitis may obstruct the ventricular foramina and result in a multicystis hydrocephalus with consequent long-lasting shunting difficulties, and necrotizing meningeoencephalitis with pneumocephalus has been reported.

Pathogenicity
The pathogenic mechanism is poorly understood. C.koseri may have a unique ability to penetrate, survive, and replicate into vascular endothelial cells and macrophages. Furthermore, it survives in phagolysozomal fusion and replicates within macrophages, which may contribute to the establishment of chronic abscesses.

Diagnosis

Medical imaging
Early and massive tissue necrosis is a specific feature of C. koseri brain infection. The early stage of the disease predominates in the white matter, causing cerebritis; the later stage is marked with necrotic cavities in multiple locations. The cavities are initially square in shape and not tense, but when pus forms and collects in these cavities, they tend to become more rounded in shape; a persisting cavity leads to septated ventriculitis that may result in multicyctic hydrocephalus.

Early, cerebritis is seen, and multiple large cavities can be seen in the late stage of the disease; abscesses formation, contraction of the cavities, and hydrocephalus due to ventriculitis are observed in the late follow up.

Pathology
Macroscopic findings include purulent exudates, opaque leptomeninges (thinning of meninges), pus, and ventriculitis/ ependymitis.

Microbiology
In samples collected from cerebrospinal fluid, C. koseri grows well on an any ordinary medium; they produce unpigmented, colorless mucoid colonies. If incubated for 24 hours in other media such as indole, citrate, and adonitol, C.koseri will be positive, hydrogen sulfide negative in Kligers’ iron agar, negative results in lactose, salicin, and sucrose broth as well.

Histology
Citrobacter koseri may be identified in the walls of congested vessels, presence of the cavities resulting from the infection do not develop well-formed fibrotic wall.

Differential diagnosis
The differential diagnosis of C. koseri brain abscesses can be confused with other related diseases, so diagnostic imaging is important to confirm this bacterium. The significant feature of C. koseri is the necrotic cavity which cannot be misidentified as earlier ischemic or hemorrhagic insult or other mass lesions; congential/neonatal tumors are uncommon (choroid plexus papillomas, craniopharyngiomas, teratomas); even when they present, they are different from the inflammatory ring of a cerebral infection. Early cerebritis should not be mistaken for normal, immature white matter, nor for cicatricial leukomalacia.

Treatment
A broad spectrum  cephalosporin and meropenem  are often used because of the good penetration into the central nervous system. If the response to the antibiotic is poor, the surgical aspiration of the collected pus reduces the mass effect and enhances the efficacy of the antibiotics.

Prognosis
The prognosis of the C. koseri infection is 20 to 30% of neonates die, and 75% of survivors have significant neurologic damage such as complex hydrocephalus, neurologic deficits, mental delay, and epilepsy.

Control
The most effective way to reduce transmission of organisms is regular handwashing.

References

External links 

Type strain of Citrobacter koseri at BacDive -  the Bacterial Diversity Metadatabase

koseri
Bacteria described in 1970